Andrée Alexander Jeglertz (born 14 February 1972) is a Swedish football manager and former professional player. He was an assistant coach for the Canadian women's national team before he joined Linköpings FC for the 2021 Damallsvenskan season.

Career

Playing career
A defender, Jeglertz played 25 games in the Allsvenskan for Malmö FF and also played club football for IFK Trelleborg, Umeå FC, IFK Hasselholm and Gimonäs CK. He earned three caps for the Swedish under-21 national side.

Coaching career
Jeglertz moved from Umeå IK to Djurgårdens IF for the 2009 season, having previously also coached Gimonäs CK for one season. While at Umeå, Jeglertz won the Damallsvenskan Manager of the Year award twice, and won the UEFA Women's Champions League in 2004. He was awarded the Finnish Football Manager of the Year in 2012. In November 2020 Jeglertz agreed to return to domestic women's football as the head coach of Linköpings FC.

References

1972 births
Living people
Association football defenders
Swedish footballers
Allsvenskan players
Malmö FF players
IFK Trelleborg players
Umeå FC players
IFK Hässleholm players
Swedish football managers
Djurgårdens IF Fotboll managers
Finland women's national football team managers
Footballers from Malmö